The 179th Vitebsk Red Banner Rifle Division was an infantry division of the Soviet Union's Red Army during World War II.

World War II

Formation 
Established at Vilnius on 17 August 1940 as part of the 29th Lithuanian Territorial Rifle Corps on the basis of the 1st Infantry Division of the Lithuanian Army:

Battles 
With 29th Rifle Corps of 11th Army on June 22, 1941. Fought at Kalinin, Gomel, and Vitebsk; with 4th Shock Army of the Kurland Group (Leningrad Front) May 1945.

After World War II 
It was reduced to the 27th Rifle Brigade in 1948 at Uralsk. It became a division again in October 1953. 

In 1955, the division became the 4th Rifle Division at Buzuluk in the South Ural Military District.

See also
List of infantry divisions of the Soviet Union 1917–1957

References

Books

Robert G. Poirier and Albert Z. Conner, The Red Army Order of Battle in the Great Patriotic War, Novato: Presidio Press, 1985. .

179
Military units and formations established in 1940
Military history of Lithuania during World War II
Military units and formations awarded the Order of the Red Banner